Colin Cochart (born July 7, 1987) is a former American football tight end in the National Football League for the Cincinnati Bengals and Dallas Cowboys. He was signed by the Cincinnati Bengals as an undrafted free agent in 2011. He played college football at South Dakota State.

Early years
Cochart attended Kewanee High School in Wisconsin. As a senior, he tallied 44 receptions for 785 yards and 10 touchdowns. He received All-conference, All-state and Packerland Receiver of the Year honors.

He accepted a football scholarship from South Dakota State University. As a redshirt freshman, he appeared in all 11 games as a backup tight end and special teams player.

As a sophomore, he started 11 ut of 12 games. Making 23 receptions (fifth on the team) ranked fifth on team with 23 receptions for 400 yards. As a junior, he ranked fourth on the team with 26 receptions and led the team with 5 receiving touchdowns.

Professional career

Cincinnati Bengals
In 2011, he was signed by the Bengals as an undrafted free agent. He was active for 10 games (3 starts). He played mainly on special teams. He registered 5 receptions for 44 yards and one touchdown. On August 31, 2012, he was released after being passed on the depth chart by rookie tight end Orson Charles.

Dallas Cowboys
On September 1, 2012, Cochart was claimed off of waivers by the Dallas Cowboys, to provide depth while tight end Jason Witten recovered from a lacerated spleen injury. He was declared inactive for the first game. On September 11, he was released after Witten was able to play in the season opener against the New York Giants. 

On January 7, 2013, he was re-signed by the Dallas Cowboys. He was released on August 27.

References

External links
South Dakota State Jackrabbits bio
Cincinnati Bengals bio
TE Cochart Presented Little Time To Learn Cowboys' Playbook

1987 births
Living people
People from Kewaunee, Wisconsin
Players of American football from Wisconsin
American football tight ends
South Dakota State Jackrabbits football players
Cincinnati Bengals players
Dallas Cowboys players